Primera Plana was a weekly glossy political, cultural and current affairs magazine published in Buenos Aires, Argentina, between 1962 and 1973. The magazine was very influential in shaping the journalism tradition in the country.

History and profile
Primera Plana was created in 1962 by Jacobo Timerman. The magazine modeled on Newsweek and Time magazines. It was founded to support for the supposedly liberal wing of the military forces. The headquarters of the magazine was in Buenos Aires.

The magazine was published on a weekly basis and featured articles on culture and current affairs. The weekly had a nationalist stance. It also supported for cultural nationalism and modernization as well as political authoritarianism.

It was the first magazine to publish the comic strip Mafalda. Mafalda, produced by Joaquin Salvador Lavado, was first published in the magazine on 29 September 1964. Primera Plana was also the first magazine in Argentine which published a list of best-selling books. In June 1964 the magazine initiated an annual literary prize. In 1967 Daniel Moyano's novel El Oscuro won the prize.

Peruvian novelist Mario Vargas Llosa was the Lima correspondent of Primera Plana. Argentine author Tomas Eloy Martinez was one of the editors-in-chief of the magazine.

During its existence Primera Plana was closed down by military government several times. In 1971 Juan Perón acquired the magazine when he was in exile in Spain. It ceased publication in 1973.

References

1962 establishments in Argentina
1973 disestablishments in Argentina
Censorship in Argentina
Defunct literary magazines
Defunct political magazines
Defunct magazines published in Argentina
Literary magazines published in Argentina
Magazines established in 1962
Magazines disestablished in 1973
Magazines published in Buenos Aires
News magazines published in Argentina
Spanish-language magazines
Weekly magazines